Aeronautics Ltd. (formerly NETS Integrated Avionics Systems) is an Israeli company specializing in the manufacturing of Unmanned Aerial Systems for military uses. Since its establishment in 1997, the company has sold its products to more than 20 defense, military and homeland security customers in 15 countries. Its headquarters are in Yavne, Israel.

Aeronautics’ senior management is made up of leading figures from Israel’s defense, financial and political sectors. The company's CEO is Amos Mathan, who previously served as the CEO of Soltam Systems. The chairman of the board is Yedidia Yaari, a retired vice admiral who was the commander-in-chief of the Israeli Navy from 2000 to 2004 and the president of defense firm Rafael Advanced Defense Systems Ltd. from 2004 to 2015.

On September 2, 2019, The company has completed acquisition by Rafael Advanced Defense Systems and Israeli businessman Avihai Stolero.

History
The company was founded by Zvika Nave, Moshe Caspi and Avi Leumi in 1997 as a start-up called NETS Integrated Avionics Systems. Since its inception, Aeronautics focused on developing low cost, miniature Unmanned Aerial Systems and managed to stand out both in the Israeli and the global markets. In 2000, the company introduced the world's smallest avionics system, which eventually evolved into the Orbiter 1 kg UAV

In 2004, Aeronautics launched Seastar, one of the world's first unmanned maritime vehicles

In 2006, Aeronautics signed a $250 million deal with Nigeria to supply unmanned aerial vehicles and unmanned ships to protect the Niger Delta area, the country's main stockpile of oil.

In 2007, Internet entrepreneur Avi Shaked (founder of 888 Holdings) acquired 33% of the company's share for $20 million.

In 2009,  Viola Private Equity partners, a group founded by investor Shlomo Dovrat, bought $20 million worth of the company's preference shares at a valuation of $200 million.

In 2012, Aeronautics Orbiter 2 was selected by Finland’s Defence Ministry, the deal included 55 UAS'. The acquisition aimed at giving the nation’s armed forces new surveillance, target acquisition and reconnaissance capabilities.

Controversies 
On August 29, 2017 the Defense Export Controls Agency of the Israeli Ministry of Defense suspended Aeronautics' permit to export Orbiter 1K model UAV to Azerbaijan. The move came after report that Aeronautics representatives have conducted a live-fire test of its Orbiter 1K model against Armenian forces in Nagorno-Karabakh at the request of the Azerbaijani military. According to Armenian military officials, two soldiers were lightly wounded as a result of the attack on July 7, 2017.

In 2018 the Justice Ministry said prosecutors intended to press charges against its employees for aggravated fraud and violations of the defense export law. Aeronautics and three of its senior employees were charged on December 30, 2021 with "violating the law regulating defense exports in its dealing with one of its most prominent clients".

Subsidiaries
 Commtact Ltd: develops a variety of microwave data link communications solutions – Transmitters, Receivers and Antenna Systems in a wide spectrum of frequencies band. Aeronautics holds 100% of Commtact.
 RT Ltd: a company that designs and manufactures the SkyStar family of aerostats, for use in intelligence, surveillance, reconnaissance and communications applications. Aeronautics holds 51% of RT.
 CONTROP Precision Technologies Ltd: a developer and manufacturer of electro-optical and precision motion control systems, acquired in 2012. Aeronautics holds 50% of Controp jointly with Rafael Advanced Defense Systems, which holds the other 50%.
 Zanzottera SRL:  an Italian company, acquired in 2004, which is dedicated to the design, development and production of piston engines for the propulsion of small and medium-sized UAVs. Aeronautics holds 100% of Zanzottera.
 Azad Systems: an Azerbaijani company, established in 2011 with assistance from Aeronautics Defense Systems. It is considered a joint venture with the Azeri government, and Aeronautics has an option to acquire 50% of the shares.

Products

Unmanned aerial systems (UASs)

Dominator MALE UAS
The Dominator UAS is a twin-engine medium-altitude long endurance (MALE) UAS based on the Diamond DA-42 aircraft. The 1800 kg (MTOW) Dominator can stay airborne for 24 hours and carry a payload of 415 kg. Introduced in 2011, Dominator serves 2 military undisclosed customers. It is as well involved in a civil UAS program in Canada operated in cooperation by Aeronautics and CAE.
Aerostar Tactical UAS
Aerostar Tactical UAS was introduced in 2001 and operated since by some 15 customers worldwide, accumulating 130,000 operational hours (Nov. 2013). Aerostar was one of the first UAS to operate in civil missions such as an oil rigs protection program near the shores of Angola, as well as in military leasing programs in the Middle East and in Afghanistan. The 230 kg (MTOW) Aerostar can stay airborne for 12 hours, operate at the range of 250 km, and carry 50 kg of payloads.
Orbiter 3 STUAS
The Orbiter 3 Small Tactical UAS (STUAS) is an electrically powered, field deployed UAS designed for military and homeland security missions. Operated by 3 personnel, Orbiter 3 is launched from a vehicle mounted launcher and lands using a parachute and an airbag. Weighing up to 30 kg, Orbiter 3 can fly for 7 hours up to the range of 100 km. It carries a multi sensor camera with day and night channels and a laser pointer. Due to its special structure and quiet electrical motor the Orbiter has a very low electromagnetic and aquatic signature, which makes it difficult to detect in the field of battle. Orbiter 3 is operated by 6 international military customers.
Orbiter Mini UAS
The Orbiter Mini UAS is a compact and lightweight electrically powered system, operated by 2 soldiers. It is carried and deployed in backpacks or from a small vehicle. The Orbiter MUAS is launched from a miniature launcher and lands using a parachute and an airbag. Weighing up to 10 kg, Orbiter MUAS can fly for 4 hours up to the range of 80 km. It carries a multi sensor camera with day and night channels and a laser pointer. Due to its special structure and quiet electrical motor the Orbiter has a very low electromagnetic and aquatic signature, which makes it difficult to detect in the field of battle. Orbiter Mini UAS is operated by some 20 military, homeland security and civil customers worldwide.

Intelligence, surveillance, target acquisition and reconnaissance (ISTAR)
AISR 
Aerial intelligence surveillance and reconnaissance systems onboard fixed wing and rotary wing aircraft.
GISR 
Aeronautics' ground ISR (GISR) solution incorporates advanced electro optical sensors, flexible and robust elevation systems and intuitive operator interfaces. Aeronautics GISR was delivered to several leading international military and HLS customers.
Skystar surveillance aerostat
The Skystar surveillance aerostat system provides its users with an "eye in the sky" at the altitude of 300–500 meters above the ground level. Tethered to the ground, the aerostat may stay airborne for long days with very short breaks for helium refill once in every 3 days. The Skystar may identify a target at the range of over 20 km. proven in the demanding operational environment of Afghanistan, Skystar currently serves over 10 military and HLS customers worldwide.

See also
Israel Aerospace Industries

References

External links
Aeronautics website
RT Aerostats website
Commtact website
Zanzottera Technologies website

Defense companies of Israel
Companies established in 1997
Privately held companies of Israel
1997 establishments in Israel
Yavne
Aircraft manufacturers of Israel